Bloomfield is an unincorporated community in Washington County, in the U.S. state of Ohio.

History
Bloomfield was laid out around 1840. The community once had a gristmill, sawmill, and brewery.

References

Unincorporated communities in Washington County, Ohio
Unincorporated communities in Ohio